Antonio Armellini (August 2, 1943) is an Italian diplomat who served as ambassador to Algeria, India and to the OECD.

Career
He served in many Government of Italy offices during the early 70s, including the private office of Foreign Minister and subsequently Prime Minister of Italy Aldo Moro. 

He was spokesman for EC Commissioner Altiero Spinelli in Brussels from 1972 to 1974. During the 1980s and 1990s he served in many foreign diplomatic postings, including Warsaw, Addis Ababa and London. 

He was roving ambassador to the CSCE (Conference on Security and Cooperation in Europe) from 1990 to 1992. He subsequently became ambassador to Algeria from 1998 to 2000. He was ambassador at large in charge of international terrorism in 2002 and was appointed Head of the Italian mission and special envoy to Iraq in 2003. 

He was ambassador to India from 2004 to 2008 and Permanent Representative to the OECD in Paris from 2008 to 2010.

He has published several books in International Affairs.

Family
He is married and has two children.

Works
 Armellini, Antonio - Trichilo, Paolo. Il terrorismo internazionale dopo l'11 settembre: l'azione dell'Italia, IAI Quaderni, Milano, 2003.
 Armellini, Antonio. L’elefante ha messo le ali. L’India del XXI secolo, Egea, Milano, 2008.
 Armellini, Antonio. If the elephant flies : India confronts the twenty-first century, Har-anand, New Delhi, 2012.
 Armellini, Antonio - Mombelli, Gerardo.  Né centauro né chimera. Modesta proposta per un'Europa plurale, Marsilio, Venezia, 2017.

Honors
 Order of Merit of the Italian Republic 1st Class / Knight Grand Cross – February 9, 2010

References

External Links
 Books written by Antonio Armellini in Stefano Baldi - "Penna del Diplomatico"  Books published by Italian diplomats

1943 births
Living people
Ambassadors of Italy to Iraq
Ambassadors of Italy to Algeria
Ambassadors of Italy to India
Ambassadors of Italy to the Organisation for Economic Co-operation and Development
Italian diplomats
Diplomats from Rome
20th-century diplomats